Rosman José García (January 3, 1979 – December 29, 2011) was a Venezuelan professional baseball relief pitcher who played in Major League Baseball (MLB) from 2003 through 2004 for the Texas Rangers. Listed at 6' 2",  215 lb., he batted and threw right handed.

Career
In part of two seasons, García posted a 1–2 record with 30 strikeouts and a 5.94 ERA in 53 innings pitched.

On June 16, 1999, García became the first starting pitcher in Staten Island Yankees history. In 2008, he pitched for the Mexico City Red Devils of the Mexican League. In 14 starts, he was 4–5 with a 5.15 ERA and 44 strikeouts.

Originally, García debuted at age 18 with the Tigres de Aragua of the Venezuelan Professional Baseball League during the 1997–1998 season. In 2011–12, he became the pitcher to play the most consecutive seasons for the Tigres, with 14.

García died in a car accident in 2011 in the km 24 of the Autopista Regional del Centro located in the Miranda State, five days short of his 33rd birthday.

See also
 List of Major League Baseball players from Venezuela

References

External links

1979 births
2011 deaths
Bowie Baysox players
Diablos Rojos del México players
Greensboro Bats players
Guerreros de Oaxaca players
Gulf Coast Yankees players
Major League Baseball pitchers
Major League Baseball players from Venezuela
Norwich Navigators players
Oklahoma RedHawks players
Sportspeople from Maracay
Road incident deaths in Venezuela
Staten Island Yankees players
Sultanes de Monterrey players
Tampa Yankees players
Tecolotes de Nuevo Laredo players
Texas Rangers players
Tigres de Aragua players
Tulsa Drillers players
Venezuelan expatriate baseball players in the United States
Venezuelan expatriate baseball players in Mexico